Michael Jeffries (born May 20, 1962) is an American soccer coach and former player who is currently the head coach of Charlotte Independence in USL League One. The 1983 Hermann Trophy winner, he played professionally in the North American Soccer League and Major Indoor Soccer League, earning three caps with the U.S. national team.

Playing career

College
Jeffries attended Duke University, where he played on the men’s soccer team from 1980 to 1983. Jeffries was selected to represent the United States at the 1981 Maccabiah Games in Israel.  In 1982, Duke went to the NCAA championship before falling to Indiana University in eight overtimes.  In 1983, Jeffries was a first-team All-American and the 1983 Hermann Trophy winner as the outstanding collegiate player of the year.  Jeffries was a double major at Duke, earning a bachelor’s degree in electrical engineering and public policy.  He later earned a master's degree from Tulane University.

Professional
After his graduation, Jeffries played one season with the 1984 Minnesota Strikers of the North American Soccer League (NASL), the final year of the league's existence.  After the NASL folded, the Strikers moved to the Major Indoor Soccer League (MISL).  Jeffries remained with the Strikers and played with indoor soccer with them from 1984 to 1987.  The Strikers released Jeffries in the fall of 1987 and he signed as a free agent with the Dallas Sidekicks on October 20, 1987.   He played thirty-three games of the 1987–1988 season before tearing his anterior cruciate ligament and retiring from playing professionally.  In 1993, he became a player-assistant coach with the New Orleans Riverboat Gamblers of the USISL.

National team
Jeffries played his first game with the U.S. national team in a scoreless tie with Ecuador on November 30, 1984.  He played again, this time in a 2–0 loss to Canada on April 2, 1985.  His last game with the national team came two days later in a 1–1 tie with Canada.

Post-playing career
After retiring, Jeffries became a financial consultant with Smith Barney in New Orleans.  After three years, he decided to return to soccer and founded the Lafreniere Select Soccer Program.

Coaching

In 1995, Jeffries was elevated from assistant to head coach of the New Orleans Riverboat Gamblers of the USISL.  In his four seasons with the Gamblers, Jeffries compiled a 42–34 record.

In 1998, the expansion Chicago Fire of Major Soccer League hired Jeffries away from the Gamblers.  He spent the next three seasons as an assistant coach to Bob Bradley, helping the team to the 1998 MLS championship and 1998 and 2000 Lamar Hunt U.S. Open Cup titles.  The Dallas Burn announced the hiring of Jeffries as the team’s new head coach on January 23, 2001.  He lasted two seasons before being fired on September 15, 2003, having compiled a 23–36–16 record (4–16–4 record in 2003) with the Burn.

After being fired by the Burn, Jeffries remained in Dallas and served as a volunteer coach with Southern Methodist University (SMU) during the 2004 NCAA season.  In 2005, Jeffries was named head coach at the University of the Incarnate Word in San Antonio, Texas. In his first and only season he led the Crusaders to the NCAA Division II National Tournament and a final ranking of 23rd in the nation.  He was also named Heartland Conference Coach of the Year.  In 2006, Jeffries came back to Duke as the men’s soccer team Associate Head Coach. After Duke head coach John Rennie retired, he was not given the place as his successor at Duke and left his alma mater to return to the staff for the Fire as an assistant.

After leaving the Fire staff to serve as a scout for former boss Bob Bradley during the 2010 FIFA World Cup, Jeffries returned to the Fire as director of player personnel. In January 2013, Jeffries was introduced as head coach of the Des Moines Menace, a USL Premier Development League club.

Jeffries was hired as head coach for the USL Pro expansion club Charlotte Independence on December 5, 2014.  Jeffries first stint as the Independence head coach lasted from December 5, 2014 to December 6, 2018.  In 2018, Jeffries was promoted to general manager for the Independence, and coach Jim McGuiness was named head coach.  Coach McGuiness’s stint as head coach was short lived, as he only lasted 15 games, achieving 1 win, 8 losses, and 6 draws in that span.  On June 12, 2019, Jeffries resumed his duties as head coach for the Charlotte Independence, while remaining as the team’s general manager.

Family
Jeffries married Theresa Ann Tauer during his time with the Minnesota Strikers, and they had 3 children: Kaitlin, Anthony (A.J.), and Nathan.

References

External links 
 
 Dallas Sidekicks bio
 Duke bio
 NASL/MISL stats

1962 births
Living people
American soccer coaches
American soccer players
FC Dallas coaches
Dallas Sidekicks (original MISL) players
Duke Blue Devils men's soccer coaches
Duke Blue Devils men's soccer players
Maccabiah Games medalists in football
Competitors at the 1981 Maccabiah Games
Jewish footballers
Hermann Trophy men's winners
Maccabiah Games silver medalists for the United States
Major Indoor Soccer League (1978–1992) players
Minnesota Strikers (NASL) players
New Orleans Riverboat Gamblers players
North American Soccer League (1968–1984) players
Sportspeople from Lynn, Massachusetts
Incarnate Word Cardinals men's soccer coaches
USISL coaches
USISL players
United States men's international soccer players
Chicago Fire FC non-playing staff
Charlotte Independence coaches
Minnesota Strikers (MISL) players
Association football defenders
21st-century American Jews
USL Championship coaches
USL League One coaches
Association football player-managers